Daniel Bakka Everton Bailey (born 9 September 1986) is a sprinter from Antigua and Barbuda who specializes in the 100m.

Career
Bailey represented Antigua and Barbuda at the 2004 Summer Olympics, the 2006 Commonwealth Games, the 2008 Summer Olympics, the 2012 Summer Olympics and the 2014 Commonwealth Games.

Bailey took up running at the age of 11, but preferring cricket and football, he only became a serious athlete at the age of 16.

In Beijing at the 2008 Olympics, he competed at the 100 metres sprint and placed second in his heat, just four hundredths of a second after Usain Bolt in a time of 10.24 seconds. He qualified for the second round in which he improved his time to 10.23 seconds. However, he was unable to qualify for the semi-finals as he finished in fourth place after Asafa Powell, Walter Dix, and Derrick Atkins.

Bailey made a strong start to the 2009 athletics season, recording a personal best of 10.02 seconds and a windy 9.93 seconds in the 100 m in early May. He broke new ground at the South American Grande Prêmio Brasil Caixa meet, becoming the first athlete to run under ten seconds on the continent. His run of 9.99 seconds (achieved despite a headwind) was a new personal best. He again lowered this mark to 9.96 seconds in Rome at the Golden Gala meet and a week later in Paris ran 9.91 seconds, to finish second to his training partner Usain Bolt, setting a new national record for Antigua and Barbuda. He was the first Antiguan athlete to qualify for the finals of the men's 100-metre at that year's World Championships.

He won the bronze medal in the 60 metres at the 2010 IAAF World Indoor Championships. Finishing in 6.57 seconds, he became Antigua's first ever medallist in the event and said he hoped the medal win would bode well for the summer. He competed on the 2010 IAAF Diamond League circuit, taking third over 100 m at the British Grand Prix and Adidas Grand Prix (running a wind-assisted 9.92 seconds at the latter meet). He was fourth at the Memorial van Damme and had a season's best of 10 seconds flat at the Meeting Areva in Paris, where he was also fourth. His major competition performances that year were at the 2010 CAC Games, where he was the 100 m silver medallist behind Churandy Martina, and the 2010 IAAF Continental Cup, where he was also runner-up against Christophe Lemaitre. He also led-off the winning Americas relay team at the Continental Cup.

Missing the 2011 indoor season, he opened the year in Jamaica and achieved a personal best over 200 metres with a run of 20.51 sec at the UTech Classic in April. A wind-assisted run of 9.94 sec in the 100 m followed at the Jamaica Invitational. He headed to Europe with his training partner Yohan Blake (another trainee of Glen Mills), and his trip was highlighted by a win in 9.97 seconds in Strasbourg. The 24-year-old saw his time in Europe as a way of accustoming himself to competing abroad: "Here I learned how to acclimatise and cope with different eating habits".

He was Antigua and Barbuda's flag bearer at the 2012 Summer Olympics, but did not qualify from his heat.

At the 2014 Commonwealth Games, he was the flag bearer for Antigua and Barbuda.

He again competed at the 2016 Summer Olympics in Rio de Janeiro. During the 100 m event, he finished 2nd in his heat and qualified for the semifinals, but he did not start. He was again the flag bearer during the Parade of Nations.

Personal bests

All information taken from IAAF profile.

International competitions

1 Did not start in the final.
2 Did not finish in the semifinal.
3 Did not start in the semifinal.

References

External links

1986 births
Living people
Antigua and Barbuda male sprinters
Olympic athletes of Antigua and Barbuda
Athletes (track and field) at the 2004 Summer Olympics
Athletes (track and field) at the 2008 Summer Olympics
Athletes (track and field) at the 2012 Summer Olympics
Athletes (track and field) at the 2016 Summer Olympics
Commonwealth Games competitors for Antigua and Barbuda
Athletes (track and field) at the 2006 Commonwealth Games
Athletes (track and field) at the 2014 Commonwealth Games
Pan American Games competitors for Antigua and Barbuda
Athletes (track and field) at the 2003 Pan American Games
Athletes (track and field) at the 2007 Pan American Games
World Athletics Championships athletes for Antigua and Barbuda
World Athletics Indoor Championships medalists
Athletes (track and field) at the 2015 Pan American Games
Central American and Caribbean Games silver medalists for Antigua and Barbuda
Competitors at the 2006 Central American and Caribbean Games
Competitors at the 2010 Central American and Caribbean Games
IAAF Continental Cup winners
Central American and Caribbean Games medalists in athletics